Serum paraoxonase/arylesterase 2 is an enzyme that in humans is encoded by the PON2 gene.

This gene encodes a member of the paraoxonase gene family, which includes three known members located adjacent to each other on the long arm of chromosome 7. The encoded protein is ubiquitously expressed in human tissues, membrane-bound, and may act as a cellular antioxidant, protecting cells from oxidative stress. Hydrolytic activity against acylhomoserine lactones, important bacterial quorum-sensing mediators, suggests the encoded protein may also play a role in defense responses to pathogenic bacteria. Mutations in this gene may be associated with vascular disease and a number of quantitative phenotypes related to diabetes. Alternatively spliced transcript variants encoding different isoforms have been described.

References

Further reading